The Church and Monastery of Our Lady of Guápulo was the first Marian shrine in what is now the Republic of Ecuador, founded in 1620 in Guápulo, a beautiful corner located northeast of the city of Quito, the capital of the country, located at 2,690 meters above sea level. Friar Juan de Dios Navas affirmed that this Shrine is one of the best relics inherited from the Colony. The image of the Virgin of Guápulo was the model used for the sculpture of Our Lady of El Cisne and also that of El Quinche.

To get to the Guápulo Church, you must travel along the paved road known as the "Path of the Conquerors" (Camino de los Conquistadores), which was used by Francisco de Orellana in 1542 as a route that led him to discover the Amazon River.

History

Around 1587, a small chapel was erected in the Real Audiencia of Quito in Guashayacu (Guápulo), dedicated to the cult of the Mother of God in the invocation of Our Lady of Guadalupe of Guápulo. This dedication has its origin in the Virgin of Guadalupe of the Province of Extremadura, Spain, and was brought to Quito by the Spanish conquerors.

Guápulo was originally a small indigenous community, which, upon the arrival of the Spaniards, became part of the Cumbayá doctrine.

It was the first Ecuadorian Marian sanctuary.

The primitive image of Our Lady of Guadalupe was carved by the artist Diego de Robles and painted by the painter Luis de Rivera.

In 1593 the Ilmo. Solís, Bishop of Quito, determined the construction of a second chapel.

The current construction of the sanctuary corresponds to the third construction of the same, begun in 1650 and finished in 1690. It has the shape of a Latin cross of 60 m by 27 m in the transept.

The priest José Herrera was the promoter of this work: he toured the Americas with the image of the "Peregrina" (Pilgrim), a gift from Charles V, Holy Roman Emperor in search of funds to complete the work.

The construction architect of the current monastery was the Franciscan religious Friar Antonio Rodríguez.

Among the main artists who worked for its ornamentation are: Diego de Robles, Miguel de Santiago, Nicolás Gorívar, Juan Bautista Menacho, Gualoto, Manuel Chili "Caspicara", Samaniego.

Main works of art inside the monastery

Jube of the Choir. By 1736 the gilding of the Jube of the choir, the work of Menacho, was finished. Its Mudéjar fretwork harmonizes perfectly with the pulpit, side altars and surely with the main altar that was destroyed in one of the fires (1839).
Pulpit. Work considered one of the best in Latin America and unique in its style and form. It is made up of seven niches with their respective images. It is a filigree work considered the stands, the throne, the tornavoz and the niche. His style is Churrigueresque; its author is Juan Bautista Menacho and belongs to the 17th century.
Painting of the Immaculate Conception. Painting with the representation of the Immaculate Conception; illustrious characters are painted: popes, kings and doctors of the Church. It is framed in a Baroque-style frame, with a Mudéjar-style crown and a card with a legend alluding to the Eucharist and the Virgin Mary. Its author is Miguel de Santiago.
Painting of the Celestial Organ. Painting that highlights the Virgin of the Pillar, with five side and top pictures. Decorated in gold leaf; simulates a large altarpiece with two paintings and top. Its author is Nicolás Gorívar, and it belongs to the 17th century.
Altarpiece of Saint Pedro de Alcántara, in the right transept. Altarpiece divided into three bodies and coronation. Each body has three niches and eight columns, with a frieze and a cornice. The bodies enclose the sculpture of St. Pedro de Alcántara, attributed to Father Carlos, and paintings attributed to Isabel de Santiago. Its style is Mudéjar.
Altarpiece of the Virgen de la Nube, in the left transept; It has the same characteristics as the previous altarpiece. The pictorial theme represents the angels, and their painting stands out for the poses, shapes and elegance of the characters; belongs to Miguel de Santiago. In the central niche is the image of Our Lady of the Cloud, worked by Daniel Alvarado (Cuenca 1902), and recalls her miraculous appearance in Quito in 1696.
Altarpiece of the High Altar. The original altar burned down in 1839 together with the image carved by Diego de Robles (16th century). The current image dates from 1953 and is the work of the artist Montesdeoca (San Antonio de Ibarra). The altarpiece is the work of the Tejada Brothers. left cruiser; It has the same characteristics as the previous altarpiece. The pictorial theme represents the angels, and their painting stands out for the poses, shapes and elegance of the characters; belongs to Miguel de Santiago.
Chapel del Santísimo. Miniature altarpiece, unique in the country, in an arabesque style with mirror altarpieces. In the central niche is the famous work of the "Pilgrim of Guápulo". His clothing is embroidered in silver thread, with the double-headed eagle shield and the Sanctuary of the Virgin of Guadalupe of Extremadura. It is a work of Spanish origin belonging to the 16th century. This altar is unique in its kind for its Chinese or Mudéjar, Baroque or Churigueresque originality.

Franciscan Museum “Fray Antonio Rodríguez, OFM”
Since December 2001, the old sacristy has been converted into a museum. Three exhibition halls are shown with works restored by the Ecuador-Spain agreement (1987-1993).

The first room shows the masterpiece of the greatest exponent of colonial art, the 17th-century Quito painter, Miguel de Santiago, who represents "the miracles of the Virgin of Guadalupe on twelve canvases.

In the second room, works such as: Virgin Mary, anonymous sculpture from the 16th century, Crucifix, anonymous sculpture from the 17th century, Angels, anonymous sculptures from the 18th century, Marian decorations such as "Silver Columns" and Mariolas, anonymous from the 19th century are exhibited.

In the third exhibition room we can see works such as The Calvary, anonymous bargueños, paintings and sculptures from the 19th century such as St. Pedro de Alcántara, St. Anthony of Padua, Señor del Río.

See also
List of buildings in Quito
Guápulo

References

Roman Catholic churches in Quito
Roman Catholic churches completed in 1690
1650 establishments in the Spanish Empire
Baroque church buildings in Ecuador
Shrines to the Virgin Mary

es:Iglesia de Nuestra Señora de Guápulo